KNOPPIX is an operating system based on Debian designed to be run directly from a CD / DVD (Live CD) or a USB flash drive (Live USB), one of the first live operating system distributions (just after Yggdrasil Linux). Knoppix was developed by, and named after, Linux consultant Klaus Knopper. When starting a program, it is loaded from the removable medium and decompressed into a RAM drive. The decompression is transparent and on-the-fly.

Although KNOPPIX is primarily designed to be used as a Live CD, it can also be installed on a hard disk like a typical operating system. Computers that support booting from USB devices can load KNOPPIX from a live USB flash drive or memory card.

There are two main editions: the traditional compact-disc (700 megabytes) edition and the DVD (4.7 gigabytes) "Maxi" edition. The CD edition had not been updated since June 2013 until recently. As of version 9.1, CD images are being released once again. Each main edition has two language-specific editions: English and German.

KNOPPIX mostly consists of free and open source software, but also includes some proprietary software, as long as it fulfills certain conditions.

Knoppix can be used to copy files easily from hard drives with inaccessible operating systems. To quickly and more safely use Linux software, the Live CD can be used instead of installing another OS.

Contents 

More than 1000 software packages are included on the CD edition, and more than 2600 packages are included on the DVD edition. Up to nine gigabytes can be stored on the DVD in compressed form. These packages include:

 LXDE, a lightweight X11 desktop environment; default since Knoppix 6.0 and later
 MPlayer, with MP3 audio, and Ogg Vorbis audio playback support
 Internet access software, including the KPPP dialer and ISDN utilities
 The Iceweasel web browser (based on Mozilla Firefox)
 The Icedove e-mail client (based on Mozilla Thunderbird)
 GIMP, an image manipulation program
 Tools for data rescue and system repair
 Network analysis and administration tools
 LibreOffice, a comprehensive office suite
 Terminal server

Hardware requirements 
Minimum hardware requirements for Knoppix:

 Intel/AMD-compatible processor (i486 or later)
 Minimum RAM memory requirements:
32 MB for text mode;
Live environment with no swap:
512MB for graphics mode with just LXDE
1GB to use the web browser and productivity software
2GB recommended
 Bootable optical drive:
 DVD-ROM for current versions;
 CD-ROM for version 7.2 and older, or a boot floppy and standard CD-ROM (IDE/ATAPI or SCSI)
 Standard SVGA-compatible graphics card
 Serial or PS/2 standard mouse, or an IMPS/2-compatible USB-mouse.

Saving changes in the environment 
Prior to Knoppix 3.8.2, any documents or settings a user created would disappear upon reboot. This lack of persistence then made it necessary to save documents directly to a hard drive partition, over the network, or to some removable media, such as a USB flash drive.

It was also possible to set up a "persistent home directory", where any documents or settings written to the user's home directory would automatically be redirected to a hard drive or removable media, which could be automatically mounted on bootup. A single file, knoppix.img, was cached on the rewritable media and used to simulate a file system into which files were written for later use. This allowed the user to transparently write to their home directory.

Union mount support was added in version 3.8.1 through UnionFS. This was later replaced by Aufs in 5.1.0 to improve stability. The union mount allowed virtual updates to the data on the read-only CD/DVD media by storing changes on separate writable media and then representing the combination of the two as single storage device. The writable media could be memory (ramdisk), a hard disk, USB flash drive, etc. This means that the user could modify the software installed on the Knoppix system, such as by using APT to install or update software. The storage device containing the changes needed to be present whenever Knoppix is started, else only the original data from the disc would be used. While Knoppix would scan available storage devices for a persistent home directory by default, a user could dictate a specific location with a boot option (see below) such as:

home=/dev/hda1/knoppix.img

By carrying a Knoppix CD and a USB flash drive, a user could have the same environment, programs, settings, and data available on any computer that could run Knoppix.

This functionality was only available through Knoppix 5.1.1 (CD release) or 5.3.1 (DVD release). Subsequently, the Live CD paradigm has transformed into portable operating systems that run on external storage.

Boot options 
When using Knoppix as a Live CD, one can use boot options, also known as "cheatcodes", to override a default setting or automatic hardware detection when it fails. For example, the user may wish to boot into a plain console, or proceed without SCSI support. For this, Knoppix allows the user to enter one or more cheat codes at the prompt before booting. If the user does not enter a cheat code, or does not press any key before the timeout, Knoppix will boot with its default options. For example, to set the language to French rather than the default, one would type:

knoppix lang=fr

Knoppix is a 32-bit Debian Linux based distro, but recent releases (including the latest version 7.6) have also been equipped with a 64-bit kernel on the DVD edition, where it will automatically boot up for 64-bit computers, or by using the boot option knoppix64 manually in the command-line prompt, while knoppix will boot up the 32-bit kernel. Neither PAE nor 64-bit applications are supported by Knoppix, and more than 4GB of system memory can only be used with a 64-bit kernel.

The DVD edition of Knoppix can also be loaded onto a USB flash drive, with flash-knoppix under the Knoppix system, such that "the KNOPPIX Live System starts and runs about factor 5 faster from USB flash disk than from CD or DVD!". Besides that, the experimental UEFI support is provided for USB flash drive rather than DVD media. 32-bit UEFI firmware can only boot up the 32-bit kernel, while 64-bit UEFI firmware can only boot up the 64-bit kernel. The text interface for UEFI is similar with it for BIOS, one can also press key F2 and F3 to access information on boot options.

Popularity 
Knoppix was one of the first Live CD Linux distributions to gain popularity. There are several factors that contribute to the popularity of Knoppix:

 Knoppix was one of the first Live CDs available, and is known as the "original" Debian-based Live CD
 Its extensive hardware detection allows most systems to start Knoppix without any configuration
 Its ability to automatically connect to most kinds of networks
 Its utilities for system repair and troubleshooting

Knoppix works on a fairly large number of PCs or laptops, but not all. The automatic hardware detection cannot cope with all hardware, and sometimes the drivers used will not be optimal. Knoppix has difficulty recognizing some cards made before 1998, or motherboards with a BIOS made before 2002. (In some cases, manual configuration with codes entered at boot time can overcome problems with automatic detection.)

If a PC does not have enough RAM to run KDE and other included programs, the legacy Knoppix (earlier than 6.0) boots up a very limited Tab Window Manager (twm) session instead. The only window running in the twm session by default is xterm.

Versions 

The table (to the right) shows the version history of major releases.

Knoppix 4.x–5.x
As of April 2008, from version 4 up until 5.1.1, Knoppix has been split into a DVD "maxi" edition (with over 9 GB of software), and a CD "light" edition; both were developed in parallel.

Up until Knoppix 5.1.1, the CD editions contained a selection of graphical environments, including the TWM window manager, and KDE 3 — a feature-complete desktop environment default in Knoppix 5.3.1 and earlier.

No further development is being done on the traditional 5.x versions.

Knoppix 6.x
KNOPPIX 6.0.1 / ADRIANE 1.1 is a CD-edition again, and a complete rebuild from scratch. LXDE was made the default desktop environment, and the edition contains a substantially reduced software collection in order to easily fit on a CD.

The KNOPPIX 6.2.1 release has both CD and DVD editions, and ADRIANE 1.2 only has a CD-edition.

Knoppix 6.7.1 has the last CD version with stable touchpad drivers.

Knoppix 7.x
From June 2013 on until March 2019, Knoppix 7.2 was the most recent release with a CD edition. By 2018, its software had become very outdated, as the libc6 2.17 library no longer suffices for installation of several modern packages. The 7.x version range is known for instabilities with touchpads.

Version 7.2 still remains the most recent CD version of Knoppix in wide distribution.

Knoppix 8.x
The KNOPPIX 8.0.0 edition was released at CeBIT 2017.

KNOPPIX 8.1.0 was released in September 2017 as the first public release in the 8.x series.
The version 8.0.0 has the dual boot, and a choice between three different desktops:LXDE as default option, KDE or GNOME.

Versions 8.2.0 and newer (8.2.x, not 8.5.x) are available on Knoppix mirrors.

Knoppix 8.5 was a DVD version that was not available for download, but was published as an exclusive version only bundled with a physical edition of Linux-Magazin or LinuxUser. Version 8.5 no longer includes Systemd, which was replaced by elogind. Spectre and Meltdown kernel vulnerabilities have been mitigated.

Knoppix 8.6 (and newer) is a DVD version available for download on Knoppix mirrors.

Derivatives

Adriane Knoppix 
Adriane Knoppix is a variation that is intended for blind and visually impaired people, which can be used entirely without vision oriented output devices. It was released in the third quarter of 2007 as a Live CD. Adriane Knoppix is named after Adriane Knopper, the wife of Klaus Knopper, the developer of Knoppix. Adriane has a visual impairment, and has been assisting Klaus with the development of the software. The name Adriane is also a backronym for "Audio Desktop Reference Implementation And Networking Environment".

Adriane Knoppix is intended not only for the blind but also for beginners who don't know much about computers. It uses the SUSE Blinux screen reader with a phoneme generator and speech engine for normal output.

Other variations 

 Kali Linux, a live CD/USB distribution now based on Debian. It is a rewrite of BackTrack, which was based on Knoppix. Like its predecessors, Kali is designed for digital forensics and penetration testing. BackTrack itself merged the Auditor Security Collection and WHAX distros.
 Kanotix, a live distribution now based on Debian.
 KnoppMyth, a distro that attempts to make the Linux and MythTV installation as trivial as possible.
 Musix GNU+Linux, specifically for musicians.
 Poseidon Linux, a widely acclaimed distribution specifically geared for the scientific community.
 KnoppiXMAME, designed for playing MAME videogames
 PelicanHPC for clustering
 TechUSB, an automated computer distro produced by RepairTech, Inc.

Unmaintained projects 
Sorted chronologically, in ascending order.

See also 
 Comparison of Linux distributions
 Debian Live

Notes

Books

News article 
 Distrowatch.com interview with Klaus Knopper (2002)

References

External links 

 
 
 

 
Debian-based distributions
Linux distributions
Linux distributions without systemd
Live CD
LiveDistro
Live USB
Operating system distributions bootable from read-only media